Love Game is a 2009 Japanese TV series by Yomiuri Telecasting Corporation.

The 13 episodes take the premise of a game organized by the lead character Himuro Sae (played by Yumiko Shaku), with the supporting role of the "mystery woman" (played by Japanese actress Yuki) in a different persona in each episode.

Cast

Main
 Yumiko Shaku as Sae Himuro
 Yuki as Yumi Wakasugi(Mystery Woman)

Guest
 Shun Shioya (episode 1)
 Waka Inoue (episode 2)
 Ami Suzuki (episode 3)
 Ryosei Konishi (episode 3)
 Tamao Satō (episode 4)
 Yui Ichikawa (episode 5)
 Mirei Kiritani (episode 9)
 Tetsurō Degawa (episode 10)
 Mariko Shinoda (episode 11)

References

External links
  
 

2009 in Japanese television
2009 Japanese television series debuts
2009 Japanese television series endings
Yomiuri Telecasting Corporation original programming